The English alternative rock band the Smiths released four studio albums, three extended plays (EPs), one live album, 10 compilation albums, 24 singles, one video album and 13 music videos on the Rough Trade, Sire and WEA record labels. The band was formed in 1982 in Manchester by vocalist Morrissey, guitarist Johnny Marr, bass player Andy Rourke and drummer Mike Joyce.

The Smiths' debut single was "Hand in Glove" (May 1983); it failed to chart. Its follow-up, "This Charming Man" (October 1983), met with critical approval and reached number 25 on the UK Singles Chart. In 1984 the band reached number 12 in the UK with the single "What Difference Does It Make?" and went to number two on the UK Albums Chart with their debut album, The Smiths. Their next three singles all went into the top 20 of the charts in the UK, helping to consolidate their previous chart success. The next studio album, Meat Is Murder (1985), reached the top of the British charts; the only single to be released from the album, "That Joke Isn't Funny Anymore" (1985), failed to break into the UK Top 40. The Smiths' next six singles all made the top 30 in the UK, and their third album, The Queen Is Dead (1986), climbed to number two in the UK.

Despite the Smiths' chart success, Marr left the group in August 1987 because of a strained relationship with Morrissey. Failing to find a replacement, the Smiths disbanded by the time of the release of their final studio album, Strangeways, Here We Come, in September that year. Strangeways, Here We Come climbed to number two in the UK and became the band's highest-charting release in the United States when it reached number 55 on the Billboard 200. In early 1992 WEA acquired the entire back catalogue of the Smiths and produced two compilations – Best... I and ...Best II – the first of which went to the top of the UK Albums Chart. WEA released two further singles compilations in 1995 and 2001, with a further compilation, The Sound of The Smiths, released in November 2008.

Studio albums

Live albums

Compilation albums

Other album appearances

Extended plays

Singles

Other certified releases

Video albums

Music videos

References

Sources

External links
 
 

Discographies of British artists
Rock music group discographies
Alternative rock discographies